Les Avellanes i Santa Linya is a municipality in the  comarca of Noguera, in the province of Lleida, Catalonia, Spain.

The municipality was formed in 1970 after the merger of Les Avellanes, Santa Linya, Tartareu and Vilanova de la Sal. Sights include the 16th-century church and the medieval alleys in Santa Linya.

References

External links
 Government data pages 

Municipalities in Noguera (comarca)
Populated places in Noguera (comarca)